KylieX2008 was the tenth concert tour by Australian recording artist Kylie Minogue, in support of her tenth studio album, X (2007). The tour began on 6 May 2008 in Paris, France, at the Palais Omnisports de Paris-Bercy and concluded on 22 December 2008 in Melbourne, Australia, at the Rod Laver Arena, consisting of 53 shows in 24 European countries, six shows in South America, seven shows in six Asian countries and territories and eight shows in Oceania.

Upon the announcement of the For You, for Me Tour the following year, both Billboard and Pollstar confirmed that KylieX2008 generated an estimated US$70,000,000 in ticket sales.

Background
After months of speculation it was announced through Kylie's official website that "KylieX2008" would commence in Paris, traveling internationally.

By way of introduction, Minogue stated:

While rehearsing for the tour, Minogue released several behind-the-scenes videos on her website. Concurrently, she released "X" in the United States and filmed two music videos for the third single, "All I See" (including an acoustic rendition).

As the tour began to sell out all over Europe and the UK, many fans speculated that Minogue would bring her tour to Australia and Japan. While promoting her ITV special, The Kylie Show on "Sunrise", she stated: "I just want to have in my head more solidly what the tour will be and if I can manage what I have so far, I would love to come back [to Australia]". It was later revealed that Minogue would bring a limited number of shows to her home country, stating, "The reason I hadn't confirmed dates in Australia is I really didn't know what I was getting into [...] But now I know".

Concert synopsis

As with the X album, the tour rippled the "new wave" theme, made popular in the '80s. The show was divided into seven acts along with an encore. Throughout the course of the tour the show evolved, with numerous changes and revisions.

The concert consisted of a high-tech three-tier stage. On the left and right, mini-stages were made available for the band and backing singers. The main stage was minimalist, with an illuminated video floor and huge moving video curtains as the backdrop. For performances in amphitheaters, open air venues and small arenas the illuminated floor and the lavish props were removed due to technical limitations.

Minogue described the show as being "a show within a show", stating that each act is dramatically different from one another. Minogue stated she was inspired by Queen frontman, Freddie Mercury. "I'm releasing my inner Freddie Mercury. It's hard to explain but parts of the show are so over the top. When I sing 'Your Disco Needs You', it's a real Freddie moment."

The first act Xlectro Static act opens the show with a futuristic video showing the outline of Minogue's face polarized in neon colours. The huge video curtains slide open to reveal Minogue perched in a giant hoop dressed in a 'spiderwoman' gown (the dress, however, changes as the tour reaches South America). On technically limited shows, the giant stereo speakers move to reveal Minogue. She performs "Speakerphone (song)", "Can't Get You Out of My Head", an unreleased track entitled "Ruffle My Feathers" and "In Your Eyes".

The second act Cheer Squad opens with an homage to the Toni Basil hit "Mickey", with Kylie and her dancers appearing as American cheerleaders. Themed as a high-school pep rally, Minogue performs "Heart Beat Rock", "Wow" and "Shocked", the latter being reduced to a dance interlude at some dates.

The third act Beach Party begins with "Loveboat" and continues with a cover of the Barry Manilow hit "Copacabana". On the opening night, "That's Why They Write Love Songs", a tribute to the many romantic show tunes of the 1940s and 1950s, is also performed. Kylie closes the act with "Spinning Around".

For the fourth act Xposed, Minogue is dressed as an 'erotic bellboy'. She appears on a gigantic skull suspended high above the stage performing "Like a Drug". The skull descends to the stage and Kylie goes on to perform "Slow", with excerpts of "Free" (from Intimate and Live), and "2 Hearts". The skull received a very positive reaction from the fans, and was replaced by a CG reproduction at the concerts it could not be featured due to stage limitations (this additional projection was not present before the South American leg).

The Asian-influenced fifth act Naughty Manga Girl sees Minogue emerging on stage in a pyramid which unfurls to reveal Kylie in an outfit inspired by Japanese manga, performing "Come into My World", "Nu-di-ty" and "Sensitized". This segment, which opens with a video of "Sometime Samurai", was completely cut from the technically limited concerts.

The show progresses to its sixth act Starry Nights, with Minogue appearing in a blue satin gown and premiering another new song, "Flower", she then performs a ballad version of "I Believe in You". The act ended with "Cosmic" on the initial dates, but this song was later dropped.

In the seventh act Black Versus White, Minogue appears as a tsar, performing "On a Night Like This", "Your Disco Needs You", "Kids", "Step Back in Time" and "In My Arms". The act begins with a black and white theme and progresses into colour.

Minogue re-emerges on stage in a Cher-esque evening suit to perform an encore. This began with "No More Rain" at all shows except in South America. There, it was removed from the set after the 1 November show for the remainder of that leg. Many songs were added and swapped around during this act including "The One", "Love at First Sight", "I Should Be So Lucky" and the acoustic rendition of "All I See". Starting during the South American leg, "Better the Devil You Know" was performed. For the first two performances in South America only, "Somewhere" was performed, a song from the critically acclaimed musical West Side Story.

Critical reception
The tour received excellent reviews from many critics throughout the UK and Europe. Many called it Minogue's best tour to date. The tour generally sold well throughout Europe and has been seen as a major success. Due to large public demand, several additional dates were slowly added since the tour announcement. Tickets for the original eight shows of the UK leg sold-out in just thirty minutes, and Minogue went on to sell tickets for more than twenty-five shows in England, Scotland, and Northern Ireland. The six shows at the Manchester Evening News Arena made Minogue the all-time most-featured artist at the venue. The UK leg of the tour grossed over US$26,000,000, with Minogue performing to around 300,000 spectators in total.

Broadcasts and recordings

KylieX2008 premiered on 4 Music in late August 2008. The concert was one of the first broadcast on the new station. It was later shown on Channel 4. In October 2008, it was revealed that FremantleMedia would release a DVD entitled KylieX2008. The disc features the full length concert along with a photo gallery and screen projections. It was released in the United Kingdom and Australia on 1 December 2008. A later release on Blu-ray followed.

Set list
This set list represents the show on the 14 December 2008, at Acer Arena, Sydney, Australia 

"Speakerphone"
"Boombox" / "Can't Get You Out of My Head" (contains elements of "Can't Get You Out of My Head (Greg Kurstin Remix)" and "Blue Monday")
"Ruffle My Feathers"
"In Your Eyes"
"Heart Beat Rock" (contains elements of "Mickey")
"Wow"
"Shocked" (DNA Mix)
"Loveboat" (contains elements of "The Love Boat Theme Song")
"Copacabana"
"Spinning Around" (contains elements of "Got to be Real")
"Like a Drug"
"Slow" (with excerpts of "Free")
"2 Hearts"
"Sometime Samurai" (Video Interlude) (contains excerpts from "German Bold Italic")
"Come into My World" (Fischerspooner Mix) (contains elements of "Finer Feelings" and "Dreams")
"Nu-di-ty"
"Sensitized"
"Flower"
"I Believe in You"
"On a Night Like This"
"Your Disco Needs You"
"Kids"
"Step Back in Time"
"In My Arms"

Encore
"No More Rain"
"The One"
"Love at First Sight" (Ruff and Jam U.S. Remix)
 "All I See"
 "Better The Devil You Know"
"I Should Be So Lucky"

Tour dates

Personnel
Adapted from the KylieX2008 credits.

Performers

Sarah deCourcy – keyboards
Matt Racher – drums
Jenni Tarma – bass
Adrian Eccleston – guitar
Barnaby Dickinson – brass
Graeme Blevins – brass
Graeme Flowers – brass
Dawn Joseph – backing vocals
Roxanne Wilde – backing vocals
Anoulka Yanminchev – dance captain
Jason Beitel – dancer
Hakim Ghorab – dancer
Marco Da Silva – dancer
Jessica DiDirolamo – dancer
Jamie Karitzis – dancer
Welly Locoh-Donou – dancer
Jerry Reeve – dancer
Tatiana Seguin – dancer
Nikki Trow – dancer
Terry Kvasnik – acrobat
Nicolas Bosc – acrobat
Vincent DePlanche – acrobat
Johan Guy – acrobat

Technical

Phil Murphy – technical manager, showcaller
Toby Plant – stage manager
Rodney Matheson – monitors
Audio Crew Chief: Al Woods – audio crew chief
Phil Down – audio technician
George Hogan – audio technician
Becky Pell – audio technician
Matt Harman-Trick – audio technician
Adam Birch – backline
Marcus Lindsay – backline
Nick Sizer – backline
Andrew Porter – lighting
John Sellors – lighting
Jim Mills – lighting
Hayden Corps – lighting
Victor Anderseen – lighting
Craig Lewis – lighting
Barry Bamford – lighting
Steve Belfield – lighting
Dave Rowe – rigger
Dave Brierley – rigger
Omar Franchi – rigger
Vinnie Rivenell – rigger
Steve Walsh – rigger
Ian Macdonald – motion control
Simon Wait – motion control
Chris Hansbury – motion control
John Richardson – motion control
Toby Pitts – carpentry
Andy Pearson – carpentry
Martyn Drew – carpentry
Jem Nicholson – carpentry
Pete Coryndon – carpentry
Lisa Williams – wardrobe
Naja Banz – wardrobe
Becky Belfield – wardrobe
Louise Martin – wardrobe
Madge Foster – hair and makeup
Gemma Flaherty – hair and makeup
Stuart Heaney – video
Andy Tonks – video
Patrick Vansteelant – video
Peter Laleman – video
Graham Holwill – cameras
Mark Cruickshank – cameras
Darren Montague – cameras
Gary Beirne – cameras
Luke Levitt – cameras
William Baker – creative director
Steve Anderson – music producer
Sarah deCourcy – musician director
Sean Fitzpatrick – tour manager
Kevin Hopgood – production manager
Chris Pyne – audio, FOH sound
Rod Matheson – audio
Blink TV – screen visuals production
 Nick Whitehouse – lighting designer
Bryan Leitch – lighting designer
 Nick Whitehouse – lighting director
Raury Macphie – tour video director
Michael Rooney – choreographer
Jean Paul Gaultier – costume design
Emma Roach – costume design
Steve Stewart – costume design
Gareth Pugh – costume design
LeAnne Buckham – personal assistant to Kylie Minogue
Michele Tankel – financial controller
Lynn Curtis – guest list and sponsorship
Juliette Baldrey – production coordinator
James Gentles – head of security
Jason Buckham – tour DJ

References

External links

Minogue's Official Site

Kylie Minogue concert tours
2008 concert tours